Edgardo "Edgar" Lao Delos Santos (born June 12, 1952) is a former Associate Justice of the Supreme Court of the Philippines.  He was appointed by President Rodrigo Duterte to replace Justice Antonio Carpio.

Education 

Delos Santos obtained his law degree from the University of San Carlos in Cebu.

Legal and judicial career 

He initially served as a municipal trial court judge in Dumaguete and later became regional trial court judge in Bacolod before his appointment to the appellate court. He was  a Cebu-based Court of Appeals Justice for more than 11 years.

Supreme Court appointment 

Delos Santos had first interviewed for the seat vacated by Noel Tijam but he was not shortlisted. He was then interviewed for the seat vacated by Mariano del Castillo  which was later filled by Rodil Zalameda. On December 3, 2019, Delos Santos was appointed to the court to fill the seat vacated by Antonio Carpio. Delos Santos retired on June 30, 2021, a year earlier than expected, due to health reasons.

Personal 

References 

Living people
1952 births
Associate Justices of the Supreme Court of the Philippines
Justices of the Court of Appeals of the Philippines
People from Leyte (province)
University of San Carlos alumni